9012Live: The Solos is the third live album by English rock band Yes, released as a mini-LP on 7 November 1985 by Atco Records. Recorded during their 1984 world tour in support of their eleventh studio album, 90125 (1983), the album features a selection of solo tracks performed by each of the five band members, plus live versions of two songs from 90125. The album was a companion release to the band's 1985 concert film, 9012Live. In 2009, the album was reissued in Japan by Isao Kikuchi for Warner Music Japan, with two bonus tracks.

Track listing
Note: "Si", "Solly's Beard", and "Soon" were recorded on 24 June 1984 at Westfalenhalle in Dortmund, Germany. All other tracks were recorded on 28 September 1984 at Northlands Coliseum in Edmonton, Alberta. "Hold On", "Changes", "City of Love", and "It Can Happen" are part of the soundtrack to the movie 9012Live.

2009 reissue 

"Hold On" and "Changes" are live versions of tracks from 90125, while "Soon" is a new arrangement of the final ballad segment from 1974's "The Gates of Delirium". The instrumental "Whitefish" was written by Chris "Fish" Squire and Alan White (hence the track title) and is based on a medley of elements from three previous Squire-written Yes tracks: his 1972 bass showcase "The Fish", the bassline from 1980's "Tempus Fugit" and a portion of 1974's "Sound Chaser". Both "Si" and "Solly's Beard" were original pieces new to this release: the first a Tony Kaye synthesizer and organ piece (at one point quoting Bach's "Toccata & Fugue in D minor") and the latter a fast-picked Trevor Rabin acoustic guitar solo, named after his dog and written/performed in the vein of 1970s jazz fusion guitarists such as Al di Meola and John McLaughlin. Versions of "Soon", "Solly's Beard" and "Whitefish" would be variously performed on subsequent Yes tours in the 1990s and 2000s.

Release 
The album reached No. 44 in on the UK Albums Chart and No. 81 on the US Billboard 200 during a chart stay of eleven weeks.

Personnel

Yes 
Jon Anderson – lead vocals, keyboards, acoustic guitar
Trevor Rabin – guitars, vocals
Chris Squire – bass guitar, vocals
Tony Kaye – keyboards, vocals
Alan White – drums, vocals

Production 
Yes – production
Alan Santos – production manager
Paul Massey – engineer
Paul de Villiers – engineer, sounds
Merle McLain – lighting director
Lookout Management – management
Rex King – tour management
Bill Ludwig – mastering

Charts

References 

Yes (band) live albums
1985 live albums
Atlantic Records live albums